is an illustrator for the Pokémon Adventures manga who took over from Mato starting with volume 10 in 2001. Yamamoto has also illustrated for the Pokémon Trading Card Game.

References

External links
 
 山本サトシ (@satoshi_swalot) - Twitter (in Japanese)

Living people
Manga artists
1965 births
Inkpot Award winners